Camponotus thraso is a species of carpenter ant (genus Camponotus). It is found from Sri Lanka, and India.

References

External links

 at antwiki.org
Animaldiversity.org

varians
Hymenoptera of Asia
Insects described in 1863